Cherry red may refer to:

 "Cherry Red" (Law & Order: Criminal Intent), an episode of Law & Order: Criminal Intent
 Cherry Red Airline, a defunct Canadian airline
 Cherry Red (album), 1967 album by Eddie "Cleanhead" Vinson
 Cherry Red Records, a UK record label
 Cerise (color), a colour
 "Cherry Red" (song), a 1966 song by the Bee Gees
 "Cherry Red", a song by Ida Maria from Katla
 "Cherry Red", a song by ZZ Top from Antenna